Polylychnis is a genus of flowering plants belonging to the family Acanthaceae.

Its native range is Guianas.

Species:
 Polylychnis radicans (Nees) Wassh.

References

Acanthaceae
Acanthaceae genera